Shunichi Suzuki may refer to:

, Japanese politician and bureaucrat
, Japanese politician

See also
Shin'ichi Suzuki (disambiguation)